"Old Time Feeling" is a song written by Tom Jans and Will Jennings and originally released by Tom Jans on the album Tom Jans (1974).

In 1976 the song was recorded by the duo of Johnny Cash and June Carter Cash. Released in October 1976 as a single (Columbia 3-10436, with "Far Side Banks of Jordan" on the opposite side), the song reached number 26 on U.S. Billboard country chart for the week of March 10, 1973.

The song was later included on Cash's 1978 compilation Greatest Hits, Vol. 3.

Track listing

Charts

References

External links 
 "Old Time Feeling" on the Johnny Cash official website

Johnny Cash songs
June Carter Cash songs
Songs written by Tom Jans
Songs with lyrics by Will Jennings
1974 songs
1976 singles
Columbia Records singles